Abass Issah (born 26 September 1998) is a Ghanaian professional footballer who plays as a forward for Chaves.

Club career
On 31 August 2018, the last day of the 2018 summer transfer window, Issah joined Bundesliga side 1. FSV Mainz 05.
On 6 January 2020, Issah joined Dutch club FC Twente on a loan deal until the end of the season.

On 31 August 2022, his contract with Mainz was dissolved by mutual consent.

International career
Whilst playing domestic football in Ghana, Issah represented Ghana U17.

Honours
Olimpija Ljubljana
Slovenian PrvaLiga: 2017–18
Slovenian Cup: 2017–18

References

1998 births
Living people
People from Ashanti Region
Ghanaian footballers
Ghana youth international footballers
Association football forwards
Slovenian PrvaLiga players
Bundesliga players
Eredivisie players
Eerste Divisie players
Croatian Football League players
NK Olimpija Ljubljana (2005) players
1. FSV Mainz 05 players
FC Utrecht players
FC Twente players
HNK Rijeka players
Ghanaian expatriate footballers
Ghanaian expatriate sportspeople in Slovenia
Expatriate footballers in Slovenia
Ghanaian expatriate sportspeople in Germany
Expatriate footballers in Germany
Ghanaian expatriate sportspeople in the Netherlands
Expatriate footballers in the Netherlands
Ghanaian expatriate sportspeople in Croatia
Expatriate footballers in Croatia